Jeff Fleming (born 8 September 1979) is a footballer who plays as a midfielder for the National Premier Leagues side Avondale FC. Originally from Canterbury, he has represented the New Zealand national football team and made a single appearance for the New Zealand Knights in the A-League.

Fleming made his debut for the New Zealand national football team as a substitute in a 1–0 win against Malaysia on 19 February 2006.

References 

1979 births
Living people
New Zealand association footballers
New Zealand international footballers
New Zealand expatriate association footballers
A-League Men players
Green Gully SC players
New Zealand Knights FC players
Canterbury United players
Avondale FC players
Association football midfielders